The Kentucky Route 2014 Bridge along Kentucky Route 2014 in Bell County, Kentucky, was a truss bridge spanning the Cumberland River near Pineville, Kentucky. The bridge was a Warren through truss bridge, and one of the early styles of the bridge. The bridge was constructed in 1873 by the Louisville Bridge and Iron Company of Louisville, Kentucky, and the Phoenix Iron Company of Pennsylvania and subsequently maintained by the Kentucky Transportation Cabinet.

History
The Kentucky Route 2014 Bridge was constructed mostly by the Louisville Bridge and Iron Company; Phoenix Iron Company supplied the Phoenix columns used on the bridge, which were patented in 1862. The bridge was not structurally safe for some time prior to its replacement in 1993. It was found eligible for the National Register of Historic Places and only one of two constructed by the Louisville Bridge and Iron Company in Kentucky. The Route 2014 Bridge, when constructed in 1873, proved to be a large and good example of its construction.

The bridge, which served people in rural areas around Pineville, was rated a 38.3 out of 100 points in a May 1, 1987, survey, which also included the 15-ton limit. A lot of the 70 historic bridges spread throughout Kentucky are either Pratt or Warren through trusses, the two most popular kinds of trusses. The Kentucky Route 2014 Bridge, along with others built in the early nineteenth century, represented an early style of bridge construction.

Bridge details

The bridge was known for its unique top chord, which was created through a sectional, eight-sided cast iron columns bolted at each point. The bridge also had unusual flooring made out of pin-connected wood truss beams, which provided greater strength with lighter weight.

See also
List of bridges documented by the Historic American Engineering Record in Kentucky
List of state highways in Kentucky
Bell County, Kentucky

References

External links

Buildings and structures in Bell County, Kentucky
Historic American Engineering Record in Kentucky
Road bridges in Kentucky
Warren truss bridges in the United States
Bridges completed in 1873
1873 establishments in Kentucky
Transportation in Bell County, Kentucky